The 1987 European Junior Badminton Championships was the tenth edition of the European Junior Badminton Championships. It was held in Warsaw, Poland, in the month of April. Danish players won the Girls' singles, Boys' doubles and Mixed doubles while Finland won Boys' singles and Sweden won Girls' doubles title.

Medalists

Medal table

Results

Semi-finals

Finals

References 

European Junior Badminton Championships
European Junior Badminton Championships
European Junior Badminton Championships
European Junior Badminton Championships
International sports competitions hosted by Poland